Gibberula granulinaformis is a species of very small sea snail, a marine gastropod mollusc or micromollusc in the family Cystiscidae.

Description
The length of the shell attains 1.76 mm.

Distribution
It occurs in the Caribbean Sea off Venezuela.

References

External links

granulinaformis
Gastropods described in 2008